Agrilus abstersus is a species of metallic wood-boring beetle in the family Buprestidae. It is found in Central America and North America.

References

Further reading

 
 
 

abstersus
Beetles of Central America
Beetles of North America
Taxa named by George Henry Horn
Beetles described in 1891
Articles created by Qbugbot